"D.A.N.C.E." is the second single by Justice and the first from their album †. It includes edited and extended versions of "D.A.N.C.E", a rougher mix in the style of their earlier releases, "B.E.A.T", and the track "Phantom" which was previously issued in limited quantities twice on 12" vinyl preceding the release of "D.A.N.C.E.".

History and background
According to the duo, they were huge Michael Jackson fans and decided to dedicate this song to him. The song recites numerous Michael Jackson songs including "P.Y.T. (Pretty Young Thing)", "Black or White", "Workin' Day and Night" and "Whatever Happens" along with The Jackson 5 song "ABC" and Michael Jackson's album Music and Me. The verses of "D.A.N.C.E." contain an interpolation of the coda of Britney Spears's song "Me Against the Music". Vocals are provided by the London-based Foundation for Young Musicians choir.

The song was number 4 on Rolling Stones list of the 100 Best Songs of 2007.

There was much hype prior to the single's release, and in the weeks leading up to its official release, many unofficial remixes of the song began to appear on the Internet. Canadian electronic duo MSTRKRFT released an official version, being the only group to receive instrumentals and vocals separately. One remix was made by Washington, D.C. rapper Wale entitled "W.A.L.E.D.A.N.C.E."; the Chicago Reader picked it as a staff favourite from 2007 and called the remix "positively epic". Wale and Ronson performed the song at the 2007 MTV Video Music Awards, and Wale later appeared on the cover of URB magazine with Justice.

Music video
The music video for "D.A.N.C.E." was shot by French directorial duo Jonas & François, with animation by French animator So Me. The video was nominated for the 2007 MTV Video Music Award "Video of the Year", while winning the award at the MTV Europe Music Awards. The music video is shot in the style of pop art. In the video, Augé and de Rosnay walk, and the images of their t-shirts constantly change and morph (cars, mouths, thunderbolts, lollipops, numbers, letters and the lyrics). It includes a reference to the song "Video Killed the Radio Star" by the Buggles with the word "radio" replaced by "internet" at one point.

Format and track listing

7" single
 "D.A.N.C.E."
 "B.E.A.T."

12" ED 016
 "D.A.N.C.E." (radio edit)
 "B.E.A.T." (extended)
 "D.A.N.C.E." (extended)
 "Phantom"

Remixes 12" ED 019
 "D.A.N.C.E." (radio edit)
 "D.A.N.C.E." (Stuart Price remix)
 "D.A.N.C.E." (Jackson remix)
 "D.A.N.C.E." (MSTRKRFT remix)
 "D.A.N.C.E." (live version)
 "D.A.N.C.E." (Alan Braxe and Fred Falke remix)

Chart performance

Weekly charts

Year-end charts

Certifications

References

External links 
 "Justice - D.A.N.C.E. (Official Video)" at YouTube

2007 singles
Justice (band) songs
2007 songs
Songs about dancing
Michael Jackson